Kherwal Soren (born 9 December 1957) or Kalipada Soren is a Santhali playwright, author and editor.

Career
Kherwal Soren, born as Kalipada Soren in 1957 at Raghunathpur near Jhargram in West Bengal, graduated from Seva Bharati Mahavidyalaya and passed M.A in political science from Rabindra Bharati University. He regularly edits a literary magazine Kherwal Jaher. Soren has written 31 plays and a number of stories and poems in the Santhali language. He translated Anubhab, a Bengali novel of Dibyendu Palit into Santhali. He received the Sarada Prasad Kisku award for his literary contribution. He retired from State Bank of India. In 2007, Soren was awarded the Sahitya Akademi for his play Chet Re Cikayana. He was conferred the Padma Shri award in 2022.

References

Living people
1957 births
Recipients of the Sahitya Akademi Award in Santali
Santali people
Santali writers
Adivasi writers
People from Jhargram district
Writers from West Bengal
Recipients of the Padma Shri in literature & education
Rabindra Bharati University alumni
Recipients of the Sahitya Akademi Prize for Translation